The 2008–09 season was the 98th season in the history of Grenoble Foot 38 and the club's first season back in the top flight of French football since 1963. In addition to the domestic league, Grenoble participated in this season's editions of the Coupe de France and the Coupe de la Ligue.

Players

First-team squad

Pre-season and friendlies

Competitions

Overall record

Ligue 1

League table

Results summary

Results by round

Matches
The league fixtures were announced on 23 May 2008.

Coupe de France

Coupe de France

References

Grenoble Foot 38 seasons
Grenoble